Bawal Island, also known as Pulau Bawal, is an island in West Kalimantan, Indonesia. Located off the southern coast of Borneo, the island was heavily wooded as of 2005.

References 

Islands of the Java Sea
Uninhabited islands of Indonesia